The name Arminius was identified as a Latinized form of the German name Hermann, possibly by Martin Luther. Hermann is also German for "Man of War", coming from the Old High German heri ("war"), and man ("man").

Notable persons with this name include:

 Arminius (18/17 BC –19 AD), Germanic Cherusci chieftain
 Arminius Vámbéry (1832–1913), Hungarian Turkologist and traveller
 Jacobus Arminius (1560–1609), Dutch theologian

See also
 Arminius (disambiguation)

References